Asif Sinan (Urdu: آصف سنان) is a Pakistan Number1 Jazzical guitarist and singer. He is known for blending Indian classical music with jazz, and playing a guitar in the style of a sitar.  Sinan is a graduate of the National Academy of Performing Arts. He has earned international recognition and performed at the Goethe Institute and Deutsches MusikFest in Germany, MOCAFest in London, and toured the US sponsored by its Bureau of Educational and Cultural Affairs.

Early life and education
Born in Karachi, Sinan began playing guitar at age 13, under the tutelage of Aamir Zaki. He later played guitar commercially and in studios. In 2004, he enrolled at the National Academy of Performing Arts and completed a four-year program in music, majoring in guitar. His teachers included Qamar Allahditta and Afaq Adnan.

Career
In August 2013, Sinan released his Eastern classical rendition of Pakistan's National Anthem, drawing media attention for his style of using the guitar like a sitar. Many international artists from Germany, India and the United States have worked with Asif Sinan because of his understanding of both Eastern and Western music. In 2012, he performed at the Goethe Institute, the Institute of Business Administration, Muhammad Ali Jinnah University and the US consulate in Karachi. From February to March 2013, Sinan took part in the US Bureau of Educational and Cultural Affairs' prestigious International Visitor Leadership Program (IVLP), touring the US to perform in New York City, Memphis, Chicago, Milwaukee, Washington DC and Omaha.

In May 2013, Sinan was invited by the German government and the Goethe Institute to represent Pakistan at the 4-day 'Deutsches MusikFest' in Chemnitz, an annual event drawing more than 150,000 people. In October 2013, Sinan was chosen as one of the 10 global artists as a MOCAFellow – an initiative of the World Islamic Economic Forum (WIEF). The Forum's annual conference was held at ExCeL London and was attended by Charles, Prince of Wales and 16 heads of state. Sinan performed his famous interpretation of Pakistan's National Anthem at the MOCAFest.

Since 2012, Sinan has collaborated with the following artists: 
 Ari Roland Jazz Quartet from US
 Stooges Brass Band from New Orleans
 Mike Del Ferro, jazz pianist
 Dr. Peter Weniger, saxophonist from Germany
 Underkarl, a jazz band from Germany
 The Milwaukee Jazz Conservatory from US

Musical style
Asif Sinan is notable for blending Indian classical music with jazz. He plays the guitar with an interesting flourish, making it sound like a sitar in one moment and easily slide into jazz notes while remaining in the same phrasing. Both classical purists and contemporary listeners find his guitar playing unique.

His performances use folk instruments like 'Sindhi banjo', dholak and tabla as well as drums and both electric and acoustic guitars – all of which move fluidly from Indian raga to Western jazz.

See also
 List of Pakistani musicians
 Music of Pakistan

References

External links
 
 Dawn article 2012

Living people
Muhajir people
Year of birth missing (living people)
Pakistani male singers
Pakistani guitarists
Musicians from Karachi